Pattabiram , which is pronounced as 'Pattaabhiraam', is a locality in Avadi and neighbourhood situated on the western part of Chennai (formerly known as Madras), Tamil Nadu, in India.  The suburb, which falls under Avadi Municipal Corporation, is about 25 km from the Chennai Central railway station.

IT Parks

One of the Pattabiram's major industries is, now defunct, Southern Structural Limited, a factory which produced pressure vessels, steel fabrication, and container-handling cranes. Opened in 1958, the company was owned by Tamil Nadu Govt, with a total of 850 employees. Currently, Govt of Tamil Nadu has planned to build its third Tidel Park in this place. This project includes a five-star hotel, convention centre and residential flats apart from the IT park. Owned by the state government, the 45 acres of land is on the Chennai-Tiruvallur road and within easy access of suburban railway line and arterial roads, said government officials. With the state allotting 10 acres for the Tidel Park, the 21-storied building will be 60 meters tall and will have hanging gardens between the 15th and 19th floors. Large murals are planned in the main lobby and a gym and indoor games will come up on the 12th floor. The complex will also have a huge food court in a separate block. The building will have office spaces measuring 495,000 square feet, with about 50 companies in the IT/ITES sector. Office spaces will range from 300 square feet to 25,000 square feet. Work is expected to begin by January 2020 and will be completed in two years.

Transport

Railways
Pattabiram is served by suburban trains, which connects it to different parts of Chennai City, especially Chennai Central and Chennai Beach Railway stations. All trains bound for Thirvallur, Arakkonam and Pattabiram Military Siding stop at Pattabiram Railway station, with the exception of a few fast trains. 

All normal EMU trains bound to Thiruvallur, Arakkonam, Kadambathur, Thiruvalangadu and Tiruttani starting from Chennai Central and Chennai Beach halt at Pattabiram. Separate station is for Pattabiram Military Siding - PTMS situated at the north side of Pattabiram railway station.

By road
The suburb is also served by a number of Chennai Metropolitan buses from different parts of the city and surrounding suburban areas
On 4 October 2013, the Tamil Nadu Highways department issued a GO extending the entire stretch of the road till Thirunindravur - Padi to 6 lanes at a cost of  1,680 million, by means of land acquisition from 12 villages. In the first phase, the road will be widened to 100 ft (4 lanes) with center median at a cost of  980 million.

Pattabiram has a bus terminus and is served by the Metropolitan Transport Corporation buses.

Metro Train
Metro Train Proposal to extend till Avadi is Expected to be Extended till Sevvapet Polytechnic College
and a new lane on Propsal in median of outer ring road

Educational institutions
Among the major institutions in Pattabiram is an old and famous Hindu college affiliated to the University of Madras. Sri Ramakrishna School a well known school in that region which made a huge educational service in that region and was appreciated my former Members of that constituency. There are also quite a few Engineering and arts colleges within the vicinity, including A.M.S College of Engineering, Jaya Engineering College, Shakthi Engineering College and Jaya College of Arts and Science.

Schools
 Sri Ramakrishna Matric. Hr. Sec. School
 Sri Ramakrishna School
 Govt. School, Thandurai
 Govt. School, Uzhaipalar Nagar
 Govt. School, Cholan Nagar
 Govt. School, Modern City
 Thangamani Matric.Hr.Sec.School
 Good Shepherd Matric.Hr.Sec.School
 Infant Jesus Matric.Hr.Sec.School
 Holy Infant Jesus Matric.Hr.Sec.School
 Immanuvel Matric.Hr.Sec.School
 Bharathi Matric School.
 Govt. School, Chatiram

Colleges 
 Hindu College
 AMS Engineering College
 AMS Polytechnic College
 Sarvodhaya ITI
 Vinayaka ITI

See also
Chennai
Chennai Metropolitan Area

References

 

Cities and towns in Tiruvallur district
Suburbs of Chennai